Niklas Eriksson (born 17 November 1981) is a Swedish archer. He competed in the men's individual and team events at the 2000 Summer Olympics.

References

External links
 

1981 births
Living people
Swedish male archers
Olympic archers of Sweden
Archers at the 2000 Summer Olympics
People from Sundsvall
Sportspeople from Västernorrland County